Darklands is a British horror film written and directed by Julian Richards, starring Craig Fairbrass, Jon Finch, Rowena King, which was released in 1997.

Richards wrote the screenplay after attending the Beltane Fire Festival in Edinburgh. It was produced by Paul Brooks at Metrodome Films.

Dubbed "the Welsh Wicker Man" by the UK press, Darklands is possibly the first home grown Welsh horror film. The film forms part of the growth of the Cool Cymru era of arts and culture.

Plot

Darklands follows journalist Frazer Truick as he investigates the mysterious death of the brother of trainee journalist Rachel Morris. Delving deeper, Truick becomes convinced that the tragedy was murder, committed by a bizarre religious cult. But as the evidence unfolds, things take on a more sinister and potentially lethal significance for the reporter, as he becomes embroiled in devil worship, witchcraft and ultimately human sacrifice.

Release
In 1998 Darklands was theatrically released in the UK by Metrodome Films, released on VHS by Pathé and broadcast by ITV.

Darklands is available on DVD in Germany (Splended Films), France, Fox Film Corporation and Spain (Filmax).

On 20 November 2012 Darklands will be released on DVD in the USA and Canada by MVD Distribution.

Awards
Critics' Award - Fantasporto
Méliès d'Argent - Grand Prize of European Fantasy Film in Silver - Fantasporto
Best Screenplay - Fantasporto
Special Jury Award - Fantasporto
Best Independent Feature Award - Festival of Fantastic Films (UK)
Silver Remi Award - WorldFest Houston

Festivals
Welsh International Film Festival - Aberystwyth, UK
Fantasporto Film Festival - Portugal
Brussels International Festival of Fantasy Films - Belgium
Valenciennes Action & Adventure Film Festival - France
Amsterdam Fantastic Film Festival - Netherlands
Newport Beach Film Festival - USA
WorldFest-Houston International Film Festival - USA
Fantafestival - Rome, Italy
Shots In The Dark Film Festival - Nottingham, UK
Puchon Fantastic Film Festival - South Korea
Espoo Ciné - Finland
Festival of Fantastic Films (UK) - Manchester
Lund Fantastisk Film Festival - Sweden
Sitges Film Festival - Spain
Leeds Film Festival - UK
San Sebastián Film Festival - Spain
Cinenygma Fantasy Festival - Luxemburg
Scienceplusfiction Film Festival -Trieste, Italy
Another Hole in the Head Genre Film Festival -San Francisco, USA

Critical response

'Action horror with elements of The Wicker Man ' - Variety.

References

External links
 
 
 

1997 films
1997 horror films
1997 independent films
British horror films
British independent films
Fictional cults
Cool Cymru
Films scored by John Murphy (composer)
Films about journalists
Films set in Wales
Films about human sacrifice
Films about Satanism
Films about witchcraft
1990s English-language films
1990s British films